Vanja Grubač (Cyrillic: Вања Грубач; born 11 January 1971) is a Montenegrin former professional footballer who played as a striker.

Club career
Grubač played for his hometown club Sutjeska Nikšić in the Yugoslav Second League for three seasons (1988–89, 1989–90, and 1990–91), making just eight appearances. He joined OFK Beograd in 1993. Over the following years, Grubač would go on to play for several European clubs, including French Le Havre and Portuguese Braga, but would eventually return to OFK Beograd after each brief spell abroad.

In 1998, Grubač was transferred from OFK Beograd to Hamburger SV for a fee of 1.1 million DM. He appeared in 11 Bundesliga games over his two seasons at the club, scoring two goals. In 2000, Grubač made another return to OFK Beograd, before moving to Turkish club Erzurumspor in early 2001.

Personal life
His son, Sergej, is also a footballer.

Statistics

References

External links
 
 
 
 
 
 

1971 births
Living people
Footballers from Nikšić
Association football forwards
Yugoslav footballers
Montenegrin footballers
Serbia and Montenegro footballers
FK Sutjeska Nikšić players
OFK Beograd players
Pierikos F.C. players
Le Havre AC players
S.C. Braga players
Hamburger SV players
Erzurumspor footballers
Digenis Akritas Morphou FC players
Al-Wakrah SC players
Yugoslav Second League players
First League of Serbia and Montenegro players
Football League (Greece) players
Ligue 1 players
Primeira Liga players
Bundesliga players
Süper Lig players
Cypriot First Division players
Qatar Stars League players
Serbia and Montenegro expatriate footballers
Expatriate footballers in Greece
Serbia and Montenegro expatriate sportspeople in Greece
Expatriate footballers in France
Serbia and Montenegro expatriate sportspeople in France
Expatriate footballers in Portugal
Expatriate footballers in Germany
Serbia and Montenegro expatriate sportspeople in Germany
Expatriate footballers in Turkey
Serbia and Montenegro expatriate sportspeople in Turkey
Expatriate footballers in Cyprus
Serbia and Montenegro expatriate sportspeople in Cyprus
Expatriate footballers in Qatar
Serbia and Montenegro expatriate sportspeople in Qatar
Montenegrin expatriate sportspeople in Portugal